Dharwar is a village in the southern state of Karnataka, India. It is located in the Dharwad taluk of Dharwad district.

Demographics 
As of the 2011 Census of India there were 94 households in Dharwad and a total population of 407 consisting of 206 males and 201 females. There were 39 children ages 0-6.

References

Villages in Dharwad district